Marceljani is a village under the administration of Labin, Croatia.

Location 
The village is located about 3 km from the center of the town of Labin and about 8 km from Rabac, Istria in the east. In recent times, since the formation of Croatia, the village was renamed Marceljani (even Marčeljani).

Population 
The settlement was formerly part of the Municipality of Sveta Nedelja. The population is 192 (2011). At the census of 2001, Marciljani had 161 inhabitants. In 1991, the village counted 170 inhabitants. From this 33.5% were Croats, 3.5% Serbs, 0.6% Muslims and 62.3% other (at the time they were mostly regionally committed, as Istrians).

Economy 
Marciljani is home to a few private concerns in the fields of private tourist facilities, carpentry, and a dental laboratory.

References

Populated places in Istria County